"Duel at Sundown" is a 1959 episode of the Western comedy television series Maverick starring 31-year-old James Garner and 29-year-old Clint Eastwood.  A mean fortune hunting bully (Eastwood) becomes jealous when Bret Maverick (Garner) begins spending time with his girlfriend Carrie (Abby Dalton), the daughter of Bret's old friend (Edgar Buchanan), who desperately wants Bret to marry her before Eastwood's evil character does so.

An epic fistfight between Garner and Eastwood segues into a surprising showdown between Bret and gunslinger John Wesley Hardin in which Maverick fans his pistol.  "Hardin" turns out to be Bret's brother Bart (Jack Kelly), who'd been recruited to help frighten Eastwood's character who literally flees the town. Carrie realizes that she made a mistake in trying to love Hardigan and thanks Bret. As Bret and Bart depart the town on horseback at the episode's conclusion, they run into the real John Wesley Hardin, already angrily riding in to hunt down and murder the man who "killed" him. Eastwood is billed fifth in the cast but his onscreen time is as ample as anyone else's except Garner's. The episode was written by Richard J. Collins from a story by Howard Browne, and directed by Arthur Lubin. The episode has been released on the Blu-ray of the 1992 Clint Eastwood film, Unforgiven.

Cast
James Garner	... 	Bret Maverick
Jack Kelly	... 	Bart Maverick
Edgar Buchanan	... 	Jed
Abby Dalton	... 	Carrie
Clint Eastwood	... 	Red Hardigan
Dan Sheridan	... 	Doc Baxter
James Griffith	... 	John Wesley Hardin
Clarke Alexander	... 	Sheriff
Linda Lawson	... 	Lily
Myrna Fahey	... 	Susie
Ed Reimers  ...  Announcer (voice)

See also

 Shady Deal at Sunny Acres
 List of Maverick episodes
Bret Maverick: Faith, Hope and Clarity
Bret Maverick: The Lazy Ace
 Rawhide
 The Rockford Files
 Space Cowboys

External links
Duel at Sundown in the Internet Movie Database
Roy Huggins' Archive of American Television Interview
Cast photographs for "Duel at Sundown"
Onscreen cast credits for "Duel at Sundown"
Stephen J. Cannell's Archive of American Television explanation of Huggins' approach
Museum of Broadcast Communications: Maverick
Maverick in the Internet Movie Database
James Garner's Archive of American Television Interview
The Paley Center for Media

1959 American television episodes
Maverick (TV series)